Matthieu Fontaine (born 9 April 1987) is a French professional footballer who plays as a defender.

He played on the professional level in Ligue 2 for Stade Reims.

Career
Fontaine came through the youth system at Lens, however he wasn't offered a professional contract by them. In the summer of 2008 he signed a two-year deal with Reims. He made his Ligue 2 debut for the club on 16 January 2009, against AC Ajaccio. After relegation in 2009, he experience promotion twice with Reims, to Ligue 2 in 2010 and to Ligue 1 in 2012.

In June 2012 Fontaine signed for Rouen in the Championnat National. At the end of the 2012–13 Championnat National season, Rouen were declared bankrupt, and in August 2013 Fontaine joined Poiré-sur-Vie. At the end of the 2014–15 Championnat National season, Poiré-sur-Vie forfeited their place in the division, and Fontaine left despite having a year left on his contract, signing for Amiens SC.

In June 2017, after seeing back-to-back promotions at Amiens, Fontaine left to sign for Red Star where he was immediately given the captaincy.

References

External links
 
 
 Matthieu Fontaine at foot-national.com
 

1987 births
Living people
Association football defenders
French footballers
Ligue 2 players
Championnat National players
Stade de Reims players
FC Rouen players
Vendée Poiré-sur-Vie Football players
Amiens SC players
Red Star F.C. players